Asr-e Azadegan was a Persian-language daily newspaper in Iran published briefly between 1999 and 2000.

History and profile
Asr-e Azadegan was established on 7 October 1999. The founder and publisher of the daily was Hamid Reza Jalaipour who also launched Jameah, Toos and Neshat which had been all closed down before the launching of Asr-e Azadegan. However, the existence of Asr-e Azadegan lasted very brief and it was banned in April 2000 for publishing articles which "disparaged Islam and the religious elements of the Islamic revolution."

The paper was edited by Mashallah Shamsolvaezin. The manager editor was Ghafour Garshasbi who was acquitted of publishing articles that violated the press law in October 2000. 

The newspaper's editors included:
 Akbar Ganji, who wrote about Iranian secret services.
 Ebrahim Nabavi, who wrote a daily political satire.
 Hossein Derakhshan, who wrote a regular technology column.
 Massoud Behnoud, who wrote a regular opinion column.

See also
List of newspapers in Iran

References

1999 establishments in Iran
2000 disestablishments in Iran
Defunct newspapers published in Iran
Newspapers published in Tehran
Persian-language newspapers
Publications established in 1999
Publications disestablished in 2000